PROMPT, an acronym for Panchromatic Robotic Optical Monitoring and Polarimetry Telescopes, is being built by the University of North Carolina at Chapel Hill at Cerro Tololo Inter-American Observatory (CTIO) in Chile. PROMPT's primary objective is rapid and simultaneous multiwavelength observations of gamma-ray burst afterglows, some when they are only tens of seconds old.  In addition to measuring redshifts by dropout, and early-time SFDs and extinction curves of sufficiently bright afterglows in unprecedented detail, PROMPT will facilitate quick response observations at larger observatories such as the UNC-led 4.1-m SOAR Telescope. PROMPT will also serve as a platform for undergraduate and high school education throughout the State of North Carolina.

PROMPT consists of six 0.41-m Ritchey-Chrétien telescopes by RC Optical Systems on rapidly slewing (9°/sec) Paramount ME mounts by Software Bisque, each under a clamshell dome by Astro Haven. Five of these telescopes use rapid-readout (<2 sec) Alta U47+ cameras by Apogee, which make use of E2V CCDs. The sixth is being outfitted with an LN2-cooled Micro-Cam by Rockwell Scientific for NIR imaging. Each mirror and camera coating combination has been optimized for a different wavelength range, including a u-band optimized telescope. Although other filters are available, PROMPT automatically observes GRB localizations in ugriz simultaneously. The R-band telescope will additionally measure polarizations. The polarimeter was designed and built at UNC's Goodman Laboratory for Astronomical Instrumentation.

PROMPT is under the control of "Skynet," a prioritized queue scheduling system that is being developed at UNC-Chapel Hill. Skynet is written in LabView and runs on a computer at UNC's Morehead Observatory. Skynet interacts with a MySQL database and commands  "Terminator" programs at each telescope. Images are automatically transferred back to a 6.5 terabyte RAID 5 with tape backup at Morehead Observatory. Users can submit jobs and retrieve data from any location via a PHP-enabled web server that interacts with the MySQL database. However, GRBs receive top priority and are automatically added to the queue via a socket connection.

External links
 Skynet Telescope Operations
 
 PROMPT Description (astro-ph/0502429)
 SkyNet Description
 Live PROMPT Webcam
 PROMPT Technical Details

optical telescopes
University of North Carolina at Chapel Hill